A Game of Authors is a thriller novel written by Frank Herbert between The Dragon in the Sea (1955) and Dune (1965), and published posthumously in 2013. The plot involves an American journalist who faces danger in Mexico.

Plot summary
American journalist Hal Garson finds himself facing danger in Mexico as he picks up the mystery of legendary author Antone Luac, who had vanished in the country years before.

References

2013 American novels
American thriller novels
Novels by Frank Herbert
Novels published posthumously